Colin Monk (born 29 September 1967) is an English former professional darts player who played in Professional Darts Corporation (PDC) and British Darts Organisation (BDO) events.

Career

Monk won the Winmau World Masters in 1996, where he beat Richie Burnett 3–2 in the final. Monk's best run in the BDO World Darts Championship came in 1998 and 2002 when he reached the semi-finals, losing to Raymond van Barneveld and Mervyn King respectively. Monk was also part of what is often cited as one of the all-time great matches at Lakeside in 2003 when he defeated Tony O'Shea 3–2 in the Last 16 in a sudden death leg, with Monk's end average being 97.08 to O'Shea's 94.05. 

Since joining the PDC full-time in 2004, Monk has struggled for form, losing in the first round of the PDC World Championship in 2006, 2007, 2008 and 2010, failing to win a set in any of those matches. Monk reached the quarter finals of the 2003 UK Open, a run which included a 9–8 victory over the 2003 PDC World Champion John Part in the Last 16, but Monk was still a BDO/WDF member at the time. Monk's only appearance in the first round at the World Matchplay event in Blackpool in 2004, saw Monk get whitewashed 10–0 by John Part, averaging 59.96.

Monk became a member of the 9 Dart Club when he had a nine dart finish in the Blue Square UK Open in Barnsley during his 6–1 win over Ray Farrell. In the 2010 PDC World Championship, he was drawn against Phil Taylor in the first round and lost three sets to nil.

Personal life

Monk is the father of Arron Monk.

World Championship results

BDO

1994: 2nd round (lost to Steve McCollum 1–3)
1995: Quarter-finals (lost to Raymond van Barneveld 2–4)
1996: Quarter-finals (lost to Andy Fordham 1–4)
1997: 2nd round (lost to Paul Williams 1–3)
1998: Semi-finals (lost to Raymond van Barneveld 3–5)
1999: Quarter-finals (lost to Andy Fordham 3–5)
2000: Quarter-finals (lost to Ronnie Baxter 4–5)
2001: 1st round (lost to Marko Pusa 2–3)
2002: Semi-finals (lost to Mervyn King 1–5)
2003: Quarter-finals (lost to Mervyn King 0–5)
2004: 1st round (lost to Ted Hankey 2–3)

PDC

2006: 1st round (lost to Andy Smith 0–3)
2007: 1st round (lost to Per Laursen 0–3)
2008: 1st round (lost to Denis Ovens 0–3)
2010: 1st round (lost to Phil Taylor 0–3)

Career finals

BDO major finals: 1 (1 title)

Performance timeline

References

External links
Profile and stats on Darts Database

1967 births
English darts players
Living people
Professional Darts Corporation former tour card holders
British Darts Organisation players